The Seattle Yannigans/Rainmakers were a Minor League Baseball team in the New Pacific League. They were based in Seattle, Washington and lasted only one season, folding along with the league during mid-season, . They finished last place.

Record

Notable players
William Brown
Ike Butler
Count Campau

Defunct baseball teams in the United States
Professional baseball teams in Washington (state)
Defunct baseball teams in Washington (state)
1896 establishments in Washington (state)
1896 disestablishments in Washington (state)
Baseball teams established in 1896
Baseball teams disestablished in 1896